John Bunny (September 21, 1863 – April 26, 1915) was an American actor. Bunny began his career as a stage actor, but transitioned to a film career after joining Vitagraph Studios around 1910. At Vitagraph, Bunny made over 150 short films – many of them domestic comedies with the comedian Flora Finch – and became one of the most well-known actors of his era.

Life and career
Bunny was born in Brooklyn, New York and educated in New York public schools. The son of an English father and an Irish mother, he initially worked as a clerk in a general store before joining a small minstrel show at the age of twenty. In a stage career spanning twenty-five years, Bunny worked for a number of touring and stock theater companies, with stints in Portland, Seattle, and various cities on the east coast. Bunny eventually worked his way into Broadway, where he was in productions such as Aunt Hannah (1900), Easy Dawson (1905), and the Astor Theatre's inaugural production of A Midsummer Night's Dream (1906), where his performance as Bottom garnered acclaim.

In a 1915 interview, Bunny recounted how he decided to enter the film industry after determining that "it was the 'movies' that were the main cause of the lean times on stage." Bunny offered his services to Vitagraph Studios, but was refused a job because the studio manager believed he could not offer Bunny a high enough salary. Bunny, however, insisted on taking the lower pay and began working at Vitagraph Studios around 1910, where he went on to star in over 150 films. At Vitagraph, Bunny was often paired with the comedian Flora Finch, with whom he made many popular comedies – often featuring situational humor in a domestic setting, in contrast with the rowdier slapstick style used in some films at the time – that came to be known as "Bunnygraphs" or "Bunnyfinches". According to the Library of Congress, the Bunnygraph genre was exemplified by A Cure for Pokeritis (1912), which features the efforts of a wife to put a stop to her husband's gambling habit by organizing a fake police raid on his weekly poker game.

Regarding a career as a film actor, Bunny said:

There's nothing like it. No other work gives an actor or would-be actor the same advantages. In the pictures, a player gets fifty-two weeks in the year. Where is the theatrical manager who can offer that? Not even vaudeville stars can get such bookings. At best, thirty weeks is about all an actor can expect on the stage. He may get summer stock work, but even so it is of uncertain duration. Stage work is a gamble. Even when you have been engaged for a production, rehearsed from three to six weeks without pay, and no doubt bought your own costumes for the piece, you have no guarantee that it will be a success. If the public does not set its stamp of approval, your job is all over perhaps after but one performance, and you can only repeat the procedure by trying again with someone else, charging the other to your loss account, with a credit notation probably on the page marked 'experience.'

Bunny had been acting in films for only five years when he died from Bright's disease at his home in Brooklyn on April 26, 1915. He was survived by his wife and two sons and interred in the Cemetery of the Evergreens in Brooklyn, New York.

Reception and legacy
Bunny was one of the most well known film actors of his lifetime. A New York Times editorial published after Bunny's death noted that thousands recognized him as "the living symbol of wholesome merriment", and declared: "Wherever movies are exhibited, and that is everywhere, Bunny had his public. It is perfectly safe to say that no other camera actor was as popular in this country." The actress Frances Agnew wrote in 1913 that "Mr. Bunny's name is a household word, not only from coast to coast in America, but also in every city and town in the world at all acquainted with the 'movies'". An article published in London's Daily News recounted the enthusiastic reception Bunny received while filming The Pickwick Papers in England and how his fame was such that a heavy-set member of King George V's entourage was mistaken for the actor while the King was visiting Scotland.

Bunny's skills as an actor were praised by his contemporaries. In particular, his ability to convey emotion without the use of words drew comment from critics. John Palmer of the Saturday Review declared, "Mr. Bunny has an extensive and extremely flexible face. ... We know at once why Mr. Bunny never speaks. He could not possibly find words to convey the extremity of his feelings." According to The New York World, "The advent of the film drama found [Bunny] particularly well endowed for the new art of acting without words. The range of his facial expression was altogether wonderful, and when the emotion of the moment had told its story in his features there was nothing left for the words to do." The poet and writer Joyce Kilmer wrote glowingly of Bunny's acting ability, and claimed that Bunny was responsible for reviving the art of pantomime.

A 1916 Washington Times article claimed: "To John Bunny ... must be given the credit of presenting the first bits of refined comedy in photoplay. Previous to his advent into screenland film comedies were either "chases" or grotesque trick photography. He rescued screen humor from the chamber of horrors and placed it in the hall of fame". In the words of his contemporary Henry Lanier, Bunny demonstrated "that a real actor can make an incredible success before [a film] audience without any of the vulgarity or horseplay which used to be considered essential." This assessment is echoed by the modern film scholar Wes Gehring, who writes that "Bunny helped elevate at the time what was still often considered a second-class medium to a level of artistic significance".

According to Frank Scheide, Bunny's films might have been taken more seriously because "Bunny's humor was based more on comedy of manners than slapstick", a "polite" and "respectable" form of situational comedy in contrast to the "decidedly lowbrow, crass, and often violent" humor of slapstick films. According to Gehring, Bunny was "the first in a long line of American personality screen comedians", whose approach is marked by a "subordination of story to character". The personality focus of Bunny's films was also noted by the screenwriter Catherine Carr, who wrote in 1914: "In most big companies at the present day there are maintained actors around whose personality comedies are being written; i.e., John Bunny, Flora Finch, etc. These actors take the mere germ of a comedy and develop it through their clever acting into a screen production that brings laughter wherever it is shown." Modern viewers may not find Bunny's films as funny as Carr described, however. The film scholar Anthony Slide, for instance, writes that Bunny's "characterizations contain nothing creative, and he uses no knockabout or slapstick comedy. His comedy is all very middle class and very polite. Often so dull is the storyline that the comedy is difficult to uncover. Time and again one wonders if audiences ever did laugh at his work, and, if so, why?"

Despite his genial on-screen persona, Bunny was disliked by some of his fellow actors at Vitagraph. Bunny and Finch "cordially hated each other" according to Vitagraph's co-founder Albert E. Smith, and interviews of former Vitagraph personnel revealed that some found him to be arrogant and difficult to work with.

In 1918, after Bunny's passing, Samuel Goldwyn signed George Bunny, John's brother, for films but the attempt was not successful. New comedians came to the fore in silent film and John Bunny faded into obscurity. However, in 1960 he was inducted into the Hollywood Walk of Fame (though he made most of his movies in the East) for his contributions to the film industry with a motion pictures star located at 1715 Vine Street in Hollywood.

Bunny's 1914 vehicle Pigs Is Pigs was preserved by the Academy Film Archive in 2010.

Selected filmography

Notes

References

Further reading

External links

 
 
 
 
 Literature on John Bunny

1863 births
1915 deaths
19th-century American male actors
20th-century American male actors
American male stage actors
American male silent film actors
Blackface minstrel performers
Burials at the Cemetery of the Evergreens
Deaths from nephritis
Male actors from New York City
Silent film comedians
Vaudeville performers
People from Brooklyn
20th-century American comedians
American male comedy actors